Ziwerekoru "Ziwe" Fumudoh is an American comedian and writer known for her satirical commentary on politics, race relations, and young adulthood. She created the YouTube comedy show Baited with Ziwe and its later Instagram Live iteration, she was a writer on Desus & Mero from 2018 to 2020, and in 2018 she co-hosted Crooked Media's Hysteria podcast. Fumudoh stars in and executive produces the Showtime variety series Ziwe, which premiered in May 2021.

Early life and education
Born February 27, 1992, Fumudoh grew up in Lawrence, Massachusetts, the second of three children to parents who emigrated from Nigeria to the United States.

In 2010, Fumudoh graduated from Phillips Academy in Andover, Massachusetts. In 2014, she graduated from Northwestern University with a double major in radio, television, and film and African American studies, with a minor in creative writing: poetry.

Career 
Fumudoh was a summer intern at Comedy Central during her junior year of college, working on shows including The Daily Show and The Colbert Report. During her senior year, she interned as a writer for The Onion and took improv classes at the iO theater. After graduation she started working as a screenwriter on The Rundown with Robin Thede.

In 2017, Fumudoh created Baited with Ziwe, a show on YouTube that originally featured some of her non-Black friends whom she baited into making unwitting racial faux pas. It was an edited show including effects that highlighted when someone was "baited", first produced through her work at Lorne Michaels's Above Average Productions. During the COVID-19 pandemic in 2020, Fumudoh moved the show from YouTube to Instagram Live with new guests each week. The new version had no effects, and the featured guests were increasingly notable, including Caroline Calloway, Alison Roman, Alyssa Milano, and Rose McGowan. Fumudoh asked guests direct questions such as "What do you qualitatively like about Black people?" and asked Roman to name five Asian people, which she was unable to do. Fumudoh said she was not trying to get anyone canceled but that her show's goals were to facilitate good discussions about race while entertaining people and to critique the system, not individuals. She typically started each show by announcing, "This is a comedy show."

Fumudoh has appeared frequently in Pop Show, a live show she created at Brooklyn's Union Hall in which she performs original pop songs.

Fumudoh has written jokes for Stephen Colbert. She has written for and contributed features and video to The Onion since December 2013.

In 2018, Fumudoh co-hosted Hysteria, a podcast from Crooked Media.

In 2019, Fumudoh joined the cast of Our Cartoon President as the voice of Kamala Harris. She also wrote the season 3 episode "Senate Control".

From 2018 to 2020, Fumudoh was a writer on the TV show Desus and Mero. A Forbes reviewer wrote that she had the "confidence of an old comedy pro".

In August 2020, it was announced that Fumudoh was writing a book, The Book of Ziwe, a collection of humorous essays, for Abrams Books. The book was later retitled Black Friend and is scheduled for release on October 24, 2023.

In October 2020, it was announced that Fumudoh would be working with Showtime on a new variety show, Ziwe. The six-episode first season featured musical numbers, interviews with guests including Gloria Steinem and Andrew Yang, and sketches. In addition to hosting the eponymous show, Fumudoh also writes and produces. The show is notable for its colorful sets, musical numbers, and highly accessorized, wild costumes, on which Fumudoh collaborated with costume designer Pamela Shepard-Hill.

In 2021, Fumudoh wrote for the television series Dickinson and appeared in two episodes as Sojourner Truth.

Also in 2021, she played Sophie Iwobi, a comedic commentator on a late-night show resembling Ziwe, in one episode of the third season of Succession. The character was tailored to more closely resemble Fumudoh after she was cast.

Fumudoh has also written for publications including The Riveter Magazine; Reductress; The Daily Dot; Into The Gloss, where she wrote a column called "Operation Goo Goo Gah Gah"; Vulture, where she wrote TV recaps; and The New Yorker.

Filmography
 2017–2018: The Rundown with Robin Thede (TV Series) – Writer (7 episodes)
 2018–2020: Desus & Mero (TV Series) – Writer (66 episodes)
 2019–2020: Our Cartoon President (TV Series) – Writer; Voice Actor as Kamala Harris, Hollywood Hotshots, and various characters
 2020–2021: Stephen Colbert Presents Tooning Out The News (TV Series) – Voice Actor
 2021–2022: Ziwe (TV Series) – Producer, Creator, Writer, Actor
 2021: Succession (TV series) – Actor as Sophie Iwobi (Episode: "The Disruption")
 2021: Dickinson (TV series) – Writer, Actor as Sojourner Truth (2 episodes)
 2022: That Damn Michael Che (TV series) - Actor as herself (Episode:"Black Mediocrity")

Discography
 2020: Generation Ziwe (EP)

References

External links
 
 
 
 

1992 births
Living people
African-American female comedians
American comedy writers
American people of Nigerian descent
American women comedians
American women screenwriters
Comedians from Massachusetts
Northwestern University alumni
People from Brooklyn
People from Lawrence, Massachusetts
Phillips Academy alumni
21st-century African-American writers
21st-century African-American women writers
21st-century American women writers
21st-century American screenwriters
21st-century American comedians